Cysteine-rich motor neuron 1 protein is a protein that in humans is encoded by the CRIM1 gene.

Function 

Motor neurons are among the earliest neurons to appear after the commencement of cell patterning and the beginning of cell differentiation. Differentiation occurs in a ventral-to-dorsal gradient and is mediated, at least in part, by the concentration of ventrally expressed sonic hedgehog protein (SHH; MIM 600725). Dorsally expressed factors, such as members of the bone morphogenic protein (e.g., BMP4; MIM 112262) and transforming growth factor-beta (e.g., TGFB1; MIM 190180) families, can repress the induction of these neurons. CRIM1 may interact with growth factors implicated in motor neuron differentiation and survival.

Clinical significance 

Loss of Crim1 function as demonstrated by the Crim1 KST264 hypomorph mice resulted in onset of chronic kidney disease with accompanying pathology including papillary hypoplasia, functional urinary tract obstruction, ectopic collagen accumulation within the endothelium and tubulointerstitial fibrosis which was in part attributed by (endothelial) epithelial–mesenchymal transition.

References

External links

Further reading